Antaeotricha doleropis is a moth of the family Depressariidae. It is found in Guyana.

The wingspan is about 23 mm. The forewings are grey-whitish, becoming white towards the costa on the anterior half, the costal edge whitish-ochreous. There is a narrow dark fuscous longitudinal streak from the base of the costa to one-third of the disc, somewhat thickened posteriorly and a small dark fuscous spot on the middle of the costa, where an indistinct irregular curved line of grey irroration runs to four-fifths of the dorsum. A dark fuscous dot is found in the disc before this and there is a very faint greyish curved line from three-fourths of the costa to the tornus. A series of dark fuscous dots is found around the posterior part of the costa and termen. The hindwings are grey.

References

Moths described in 1915
doleropis
Taxa named by Edward Meyrick
Moths of South America